The Silver Medal of Military Valor is an Italian medal for gallantry.

Italian medals for valor were first  instituted by Victor Amadeus III of Sardinia on 21 May 1793, with a gold medal, and, below it, a silver medal. These were intended for junior officers or common soldiers who had distinguished themselves in combat.

These medals fell into disuse during the period of Napoleonic domination. They were reinstated on 1 April 1815, by Victor Emmanuel I of Sardinia, who, however, abolished them only a few months later, on 4 August 1815, replacing them with the Military Order of Savoy (l'Ordine militare di Savoia), now known as the Military Order of Italy.

However, in 1833, Charles Albert of Sardinia, recognizing that the Military Order was too exclusive in that it could only be awarded to persons of high rank, re-instituted the medals for valor (gold and silver) as awards for noble acts performed by soldiers in both war and peace.

According to royal decree no. 753 of 24 May 1915, the number of times one individual could receive a medal for valor (both silver and gold) was limited to three, after which a promotion was foreseen. This limit was abolished with royal decree no. 975 of 15 June 1922.

During World War I, the medal was awarded to military personnel, units above the level of company and civilians for exceptional valor in the face of the enemy.

During World War I, the medal was given out some 38,614 times for individual acts of heroism (compared to 368 Gold Medals and 60,244 Bronze medals).

Thus, the Italian Silver Medal for Military Valor is equivalent in frequency and prestige to the British Military Cross, which was awarded some 40,253 times during World War I.

The Silver Medal for Military Valor is still awarded by the Italian state, and it, along with the Gold and Bronze medals for Military Valor as well as the "Croce di Guerra al Valor Militare" (War Cross of Military Valor - which can only be awarded in time of war) is established by the Royal Decree of 4 November 1932, in which the purpose of these medals is defined as "To distinguish and publicly honor the authors of heroic military acts, even ones performed in time of peace, provided that the exploit is closely connected with the purposes for which the Armed Forces are constituted, whatever may be the condition or quality of the author."

Notable recipients

Italo Balbo
William George Barker VC
Nicola Bellomo (twice)
Alfred-Ingemar Berndt
Aaron Bradshaw Jr.
Carlo Emanuele Buscaglia
Federico Cafiero
Mark W. Clark
Gino De Giorgi (twice)
Ludovico De Filippi
George Dey
Arturo Ferrarin
Alfred Gause
Joachim Helbig
Ernest Hemingway
Sir William Holmes
Hans Kroh

Hans-Joachim Marseille
Mario Masciulli 
Walther Nehring
Erwin Rommel
Hans-Ulrich Rudel
Hippolyte De La Rue
Emanuele Ruspoli
Nazario Sauro
Achille Starace
Johannes Streich
 Walkiria Terradura
Attilio Teruzzi
Edmond Thieffry
Cervi Brothers
Hans von Luck
Guido Jung
Vincenzo Maturo
Ada Gobetti
Armando Diaz
Alfonso Dato

See also
 Medal of Military Valor
 Gold Medal of Military Valor
 Bronze Medal of Military Valor
Italian medals 1860-today (Italian Wikipedia) 
 List of military decorations

References 

Military awards and decorations of Italy
Courage awards

ca:Medalla al Valor Militar (Itàlia)
fr:Médaille de la valeur militaire (Italie)
it:Valor militare
zh:银制勇敢勋章